Mahakudagala is a mountain in the Nuwara Eliya District of Sri Lanka.

Mahakudagala forms part of the Narangala mountain range and is one of the range's eastern spurs.

See also 
 List of mountains of Sri Lanka

References 

Mountains of Sri Lanka
Landforms of Nuwara Eliya District